Peter Schlemihl is the title character of an 1814 novella,  (Peter Schlemihl's Miraculous Story), written in German by exiled French aristocrat Adelbert von Chamisso.

Plot
In the story, Schlemihl sells his shadow to the Devil for a bottomless wallet (the gold sack of Fortunatus), only to find that a man without a shadow is shunned by human societies. The woman he loves rejects him, and he himself becomes consumed with guilt. Yet when the devil wants to return his shadow to him in exchange for his soul, Schlemihl, as the friend of God, rejects the proposal and throws away the bottomless wallet besides. He seeks refuge in nature and travels around the world in scientific exploration, with the aid of seven-league boots. When overtaken with sickness, he is reconciled with his fellow men, who take care of him, and in regard for his sickness do not look for his shadow. Finally, however, he returns to his studies of nature and finds his deepest satisfaction in communion with nature and his own better self.

Reception and cultural influence
The story, intended for children, was widely read and the character became a common cultural reference in many countries. People generally remembered the element of the shadow better than how the story ended, simplifying Chamisso's lesson to the idiom "don't sell your shadow to the Devil."

The story popularized the Yiddish word schlemiel for a hopelessly incompetent person, a bungler.

Later retellings
The story was performed on American television, in a 1953 episode of Favorite Story, starring DeForest Kelley as the title character.

Georges Schwizgebel's 2004 paint-on-glass animation L'Homme sans ombre (The Man With No Shadow) portrays a slight variation on the original story: after being rejected by his lover and society, the main character returns to the devil. Rather than getting back his shadow, he trades his riches for a pair of seven-league boots and travels the world in search of a place where he will be accepted without a shadow. In the end, he becomes a Wayang shadow puppeteer in Indonesia because he can manipulate the puppets directly without affecting their silhouettes.

Editions

See also
 Die Frau ohne Schatten (1919), opera  by Richard Strauss to a libretto by Hugo von Hofmannsthal, partly based on the Scandinavian fairy tale "The Woman Who Had No Shadow".

References

External links 

 
 .

German fantasy novels
1814 German novels
Adelbert von Chamisso
Schlemihl, Peter
Schlemihl, Peter
Works based on the Faust legend
German novellas